Abacetus klickai is a species of ground beetle in the subfamily Pterostichinae. It was described by Jedlicka in 1935.

References

klickai
Beetles described in 1935